John Cooper (24 February 1897 – 16 September 1975) was an English footballer who had a brief professional career with Southampton in the 1920s.

Football career
Cooper was born in Wednesbury, Staffordshire and joined Darlaston playing in the Birmingham & District League. Described as "the best inside-right in the Birmingham League", he topped the goalscoring charts whilst with Darlaston. He soon became the target for talent scouts from several top clubs, including Manchester United, Cardiff City and Sunderland.

In April 1921, together with his Darlaston teammate Henry Johnson, he moved on a free transfer to the south coast to join Southampton, then playing in the Football League Third Division South. Cooper was unable to live up to his reputation and found it virtually impossible to displace the Saints' veterans, Arthur Dominy and Bill Rawlings, from the forward positions. In his two seasons at The Dell, Cooper managed only five first-team appearances, failing to score.

In May 1923, he was placed on the transfer list at a fee of £200, but with no club willing to pay the fee he was eventually given a free transfer to Notts County, although he failed to make any first-team appearances before fading into obscurity.

References

1897 births
Sportspeople from Wednesbury
1975 deaths
English footballers
Association football forwards
Darlaston Town F.C. players
Southampton F.C. players
Notts County F.C. players
English Football League players